Christopher Robert Bowie (born November 21, 1966) is a former freestyle swimmer, who competed for Canada at the 1992 Summer Olympics in Barcelona, Spain.  There he finished in 15th position in the men's 1500-metre freestyle, and in ninth place with the men's 4x200-metre freestyle relay team.

References

External links
 Canadian Olympic Committee

1966 births
Living people
Canadian male freestyle swimmers
Olympic swimmers of Canada
Sportspeople from Prince George, British Columbia
Sportspeople from British Columbia
Swimmers at the 1992 Summer Olympics
Commonwealth Games bronze medallists for Canada
Swimmers at the 1990 Commonwealth Games
Commonwealth Games medallists in swimming
Universiade medalists in swimming
Universiade bronze medalists for Canada
Medalists at the 1991 Summer Universiade
Medallists at the 1990 Commonwealth Games